Kenzhebulatov Marat (born September 17, 1978, city of Serebryansk, Kazakh USSR) — Kazakh athlete and world champion in Brazilian Jiu-Jitsu among Gi and No-Gi (SJJIF, 2021) black belt, bronze medalist of the European IBJJF Jiu-Jitsu Championship (IBJJF, 2018), bronze medalist American National IBJJF Jiu-Jitsu No-Gi Championship (black belt, IBJJF, 2021), head coach and owner of Jiu-Jitsu Bars Checkmat in Los Angeles and in Almaty.

Biography 
Kenzhebulatov Marat was born on September 17, 1978, in Serebryansk in Kazakhstan.

In 1995 graduated from vocational school No. 9 in Astana.

1995 — 1999 — obtaining higher education (Bachelor's degree) at the Novosibirsk State University (Department of Economics).

1999 — 2001 – Master's degree at the Novosibirsk State University (Department of Economics).

Marat Kenzhebulatov began his first training in Brazilian Jiu-Jitsu in 2012.

Kenzhebulatov Marat facilitated the Bars club in Almaty to represent the Checkmat Academy, which implies the possibility of raising the rank to the black belt.

In 2020 he opened a Jiu-Jitsu Gym ("Bars Checkmat") in Los-Angeles.

In 2021 he published the book “NLP Techniques in the Brazilian Jiu-Jitsu Training Process”.

Championships 
Gold at San Diego International Open Jiu Jitsu Championship 2022 among black belts.

Gold at SAN DIEGO INTERNATIONAL OPEN IBJJF JIU-JITSU NO-GI CHAMPIONSHIP 2022 among black belts.

Bronze at AMERICAN NATIONAL IBJJF JIU-JITSU CHAMPIONSHIP 2022 among black belts.

Silver at AMERICAN NATIONAL IBJJF JIU-JITSU NO-GI CHAMPIONSHIP 2022 among black belts.

Gold at 2022 SJJIF WORLD JIU-JITSU CHAMPIONSHIP among black belts.

Publications 
Strategy for building fight in Brazilian Jiu-Jitsu in the first minute of a bout (Topical Issues in pedagogy and psychology 2021. V.2, No.11)

A strategy to increase the chances of winning in Brazilian Jiu-Jitsu through a set of joint flexibility exercises. (Innovation, science, and education No.45 dated November 10, 2021)

How to Get Rid of Anxiety Before a Competition Using NLP Technics

A sequence of strength resistance exercises to increase strength performance in Brasilian Jiu-Jitsu

Weight loss methodology in preparing for Brazilian jiu-jitsu competitions

Strategy for successful technology for an athlete in Brazil jiu-jitsu

References 

People awarded a black belt in Brazilian jiu-jitsu
World Brazilian Jiu-Jitsu Championship medalists
1978 births
Living people